NIVR is a four-letter abbreviation with multiple meanings, as described below:

 Netherlands Agency for Aerospace Programmes
 Network Interactive Voice Response, see Interactive voice response
 Neuron Interactive Virtual Reality, see Virtual reality